Enamul Haque Mostafa Shahid (28 March 1938 – 25 February 2016) was a Bangladeshi politician and Minister of Social Welfare of the Government of Bangladesh. He was awarded Ekushey Padak in 2013.

Career
Shahid was elected parliament member four times with Bangladesh Awami League ticket from Habiganj-4 constituency. He served as the Social Welfare Minister from 6 January 2009 to 14 March 2014.

References

1938 births
2016 deaths
Awami League politicians
Recipients of the Ekushey Padak
8th Jatiya Sangsad members
Social Welfare ministers of Bangladesh
People from Habiganj District